Beryl Baxter (8 April 1926 - 29 November 2012) was a British film actress whose career spanned the 1940s to the 1970s.

Early and personal life
Beryl Ivory was born in Birmingham, England on 8 April 1926. Adopting the stage name Beryl Baxter, she had hopes of becoming the new Margaret Lockwood. She made her film debut in 1948, taking a leading role in Idol of Paris. She married Bernard Gross in 1952.

Filmography
 The Idol of Paris – Theresa (1948)
 The Man Who Disappeared – Doreen (1951)
 Counterspy – (uncredited; 1953)
 The Mayerling Affair – Princess Stephanie (1956)
 Encounter (TV series) – Pamela Brooks (one episode: "Depth 300"; 1958)
 Charles Tupper: The Big Man – (1961)
 The Avengers (TV series) – Helen Rayner (one episode: "The Outside-In Man"; 1964)
 The Protectors  – Miss. Nicholson (one episode: "The Stamp Collection"; 1964)
 Undermind (TV series) – Veronica (one episode: "End Signal"; 1965)
 Love Story (TV series) – Ivy Burns (one episode: "The Sad Smile of the Mona Lisa"; 1965) 
 Thirteen Against Fate –  Madame Fabien (one episode, entitled 'The Son') (1966)
 Detective (TV Series) – Mrs. Stephenson (one episode, entitled 'The Public School Murder') (1969)
 Crime of Passion (TV series) – Mme. Juhan (episode: "Magdalena"; 1971)

References

External links

1926 births
2012 deaths
British film actresses
Actresses from Birmingham, West Midlands